Pao leiurus is a species of pufferfish found in Southeast Asia from Thailand to Indonesia and in particular the Mekong basin. It is occasionally imported into the aquarium trade but is reported to be aggressive and snappish.

Characteristics
P. leiurus also typically display occelated spots which may be red, green or blue.

P. leiurus are typically found in tropical freshwater or brackish water, with temperatures ranging between 24 °C and 28 °C, including streams and rivers in upland and lowland areas, flowing and standing water habitats, swamps, and reservoirs.

Like most Tetraodontidae, P. leiurus is a molluscivore and feeds on molluscs, crustaceans, and other invertebrates.

References

External links
 Photograph

Tetraodontidae
Freshwater fish of Malaysia
Freshwater fish of Indonesia
Fish of Singapore
Fish of Thailand
Fish of the Mekong Basin
Brackish water organisms
Fish described in 1850